Acleris sparsana is a moth of the family Tortricidae found in Europe and Iran. It was first described in 1775 by the Austrian lepidopterists Michael Denis and Ignaz Schiffermüller.

Description
The wingspan is 18–22 mm. The forewings are light greyish-ochreous, obscurely strigulated with grey base, central fascia, and costal patch indistinctly darker, fascia darkest towards costa. The hindwings are pale grey. The moth flies from June to May of the following year.

Larvae at first live in a slight web on the underside of a leaf of beech (Fagus species), hornbeam (Carpinus), sycamore (Acer pseudoplatanus) or field maple  (Acer campestre). Later, it constructs a chamber between spun leaves as a base from which to feed on the surrounding foliage. Pupation occurs on the leaves, or in a slight cocoon on the ground. The adult hibernates.

Distribution
It is found from western Europe to the Caucasus and Iran.

References

External links
 waarneming.nl .
 Lepidoptera of Belgium

sparsana
Moths described in 1775
Moths of Asia
Tortricidae of Europe
Taxa named by Michael Denis
Taxa named by Ignaz Schiffermüller